The Fanckboner-Nichols Farmstead is a farmhouse and associated buildings located at 5992 West VW Avenue in Prairie Ronde Township, Michigan. It was listed on the National Register of Historic Places in 2007.

History
European settlers first arrived in Prairie Ronde Township in 1828. In 1837, William and Elizabeth Crose Fanckboner moved to Prairie Ronde from Warren County, New Jersey along with their five children, following Elizabeth's father and brother, who had settled nearby earlier in the 1830s. In 1838, the Fanckboners purchased the farmland where this house is now located. They likely constructed a small temporary house, then built what is now the front section of the existing farmhouse in about 1840. The Fanckboners lived and raised their children, including two born in Michigan, in this house for decades. The house itself was expanded twice during the nineteenth century.

The Fanckboner's daughter Libbie eventually married a neighbor, Leroy Nichols, in 1875. After William and Elizabeth Fanckboner died (in 1881 and 1888),  Libbie and Leroy Nichols bought out the other heirs to the farm and managed the acreage. Libbie died in 1905, but Leroy continued to live at the farm with his children. In the early 1900s, he had the present large barn built, along with a number of other outbuildings. 
Leroy Nichols married Emma Kellogg in 1912, and the couple lived on the farm until 1924. They then moved into Schoolcraft village and rented out the farm. In 1938, Leroy and Libbie's son Harold and his wife Lillian moved onto the farm. They farmed until the 1950s, then rented out acreage to other farmers. Harold and Lillian lived there until their deaths in 1989 and 2003. The farm was passed on to their children.

Description
The Fanckboner-Nichols Farmstead consists of approximately three acres, which contains a farmhouse, barn, Workshop/Woodshed, and grain bin, along with trees, a large yard, and a cistern. The farmhouse as originally built was a small Greek Revival I-house with a low second story. The exterior is clad with clapboarded with plain cornerboards, and a broad frieze with classical cornices with returns runs along the top. The front has a center entry flanked with square-head double-hung windows. On the front, two small horizontal "eyebrow" penetrate the frieze. Small double-hung windows are located in the gables. Nineteenth century additions of a gabled section and a lean-to have expanded the houses's footprint in the rear. Another bedroom wing was also added in the early 1900s. A Victorian, hipped roof front porch with turned columns was added in the early 1900s, replacing an original Greek Revival style porch.

The workshop/woodshed, dating from the early 1900s, is located near the house. It is a long, narrow, gable-roof, one-story structure  clad in horizontal wood siding. The barn, also dating from the early 1900s, is a rectangular, gambrel-roof building on a low concrete foundation clad in its original vertical boarding. The grain bin, dating from about 1950, is a cylindrical metal bin with a conical roof, located  near the barn.

References

		
National Register of Historic Places in Kalamazoo County, Michigan
Greek Revival architecture in Michigan
Buildings and structures completed in 1840